Trygonorrhina dumerilii, the southern fiddler ray, is a species of cartilaginous fish in the Rhinobatidae family. The species is medium-sized with mainly yellow, black, and white colours. T.dumerilii is rated least concern on the IUCN Red List.

References

Rhinobatidae